Pedro Ercílio Simon (9 September 1941 – 1 June 2020) was a Brazilian Roman Catholic archbishop.

He was born in Brazil, and ordained to his denomination’s priesthood in 1965. 
He served in succession as 
 (1990 to 1995) coadjutor bishop of the Diocese of Cruz Alta,
 (1995 to 1998) bishop of the Diocese of Uruguaiana,
 and (1998 to 2012, likewise in succession), coadjutor bishop, diocesan bishop, and archbishop, within the Roman Catholic Archdiocese of Passo Fundo.

Simon died from COVID-19 in 2020.

Notes

1941 births
2020 deaths
21st-century Roman Catholic archbishops in Brazil
Roman Catholic archbishops of Passo Fundo
Roman Catholic bishops of Passo Fundo
Roman Catholic bishops of Cruz Alta
Roman Catholic bishops of Uruguaiana
Deaths from the COVID-19 pandemic in Rio Grande do Sul